Himmatwala is a 1983 Indian Hindi-language action comedy film, produced by G. A. Sheshagiri Rao under the Padmalaya Studios banner, presented by Krishna and directed by K. Raghavendra Rao.  A remake of the Telugu film Ooruki Monagadu (1981), the film stars Jeetendra and Sridevi in lead roles. Himmatwala on release was a giant commercial success, grossing 5 crore, becoming one of the highest grossing Hindi films of 1980s. The film proved to be a breakthrough for Sridevi in Bollywood and launched her to stardom. Her dance number "Naino Mein Sapna" became a rage with Rediff stating that "the water pots may have dominated most frames in 'Naino Mein Sapna', but it was Sridevi's bejewelled outfits and headgears that stole the show".

Plot
Master Dharam Murti witnesses Sher Singh Bandookwala murdering a man. Sher Singh manages to get exonerated by using his money and influence. He wants to get revenge on Master Dharam Murti. So, he falsely accuses him of sexually assaulting a female teacher named Menaka. Dharam Murti becomes very demoralized by this incident and leaves the village abandoning his wife and children lest they also face the stigma of being related to him. His wife, Savitri, toils to make her son, Ravi, an engineer. Ravi grows up and returns to the village as the chief engineer for the village's new dam building project.  Meanwhile, Bandookwala has been terrorizing all the villagers. His daughter Rekha has been following in his footsteps and harasses people. Ravi's sister Padma gets involved with Munimji's son Shakti and becomes pregnant. Bandookwala wants to use this situation to torment Ravi. Shakti marries Padma according to Bandookwala's plan and starts torturing her. Rekha eventually understands how cruel her father is and falls in love with Ravi seeing his honesty and goodness. She pretends to be pregnant so that Bandookwala faces the same situation as Ravi had with his sister. Ravi suddenly finds his father among the workers of the dam and brings him back to prove his innocence in front of the village panchayat. Bandookwala is held responsible for all of his evil doings and is set to be punished by the panchayat, but Dharam Murti asks everyone to forgive him, on the condition that he mends his ways. Bandookwala promises to become a better person and his daughter Rekha is married to Ravi.

Cast
 Jeetendra as Ravi
 Sridevi as Rekha Singh Bandookwala
 Waheeda Rehman as Savitri
 Shakti Kapoor as Shakti
 Kader Khan as Munim Narayandas Gopaldas
 Amjad Khan as Thakur Sher Singh Bandookwala
 Asrani as Bhushan
 Arun Govil as Govind
 Shoma Anand as Champa
 Swaroop Sampat as Padma
 Satyendra Kapoor as Dharam Murthy
 Sulochana Latkar as Govind's Grandmother

Soundtrack 
The music album was composed by Bappi Lahiri and the lyrics were penned by Indeevar.

Remake

A remake of the film starring Ajay Devgn and Tamannaah and directed by Sajid Khan, released under the same title on 29 March 2013. The movie opened to negative reviews and became a Box-office bomb.

References

External links 
 

1983 films
1980s Hindi-language films
Hindi remakes of Telugu films
Films directed by K. Raghavendra Rao
Films scored by Bappi Lahiri
1980s action comedy-drama films
Indian action comedy-drama films
1980s masala films